Katarina Sonja Rodriguez  (born August 1, 1992) is an American-born Filipino actress, athlete, model, and beauty pageant titleholder who was crowned Miss World Philippines 2018. She represented the Philippines at the Miss World 2018 pageant but was unplaced. Previously, she was crowned Binibining Pilipinas Intercontinental 2017 and placed 1st Runner-Up in Miss Intercontinental 2017.

She rose to fame after being the last eliminated in the second season of Asia's Next Top Model in 2014.

Early life and education 
Rodriguez was born in Orlando, Florida, United States to Filipino parents. Her mother is from Manila while her dad is from Davao. She spent her childhood going back and forth the United States and the Philippines every other year.

She attended high school in Orlando and recounted the bullying she experienced at school, which would later on help her develop "tough skin" before finally moving permanently to the Philippines with her family. In Manila, she pursued and completed a double major in Business Management and Philosophy from the De La Salle University.

She is also a cycling instructor, a competitive long-distance runner, and participated as a member of the De La Salle University Women's Track and Field Team.

Modeling career 
At the encouragement of her two close friends, Katarina auditioned for the second season of Asia's Next Top Model. She was selected as part of the show's final three contestants along with fellow Filipina candidate Jodilly Pendre, finishing as a runner-up.

Pageantry 

After her appearance in Asia's Next Top Model, Rodriguez caught the attention of well-known beauty queen trainer, Jonas Gaffud of Aces and Queens, who encouraged her to try out pageantry.

Binibining Pilipinas 2017 
Rodriguez joined the Binibining Pilipinas 2017 pageant and won the title of Binibining Pilipinas Intercontinental 2017 during the coronation night held at the Smart Araneta Coliseum on April 30, 2017, gaining her the right to represent the Philippines at Miss Intercontinental 2017.

On March 18, 2018, Rodriguez crowned Karen Gallman as her successor at the Binibining Pilipinas 2018 pageant held at the Smart Araneta Coliseum in Quezon City, Philippines.

Miss Intercontinental 2017 
Rodriguez represented the Philippines at the Miss Intercontinental 2017 pageant held in Hurghada, Egypt on January 24, 2018 where she finished as 1st runner-up to Veronica Salas Vallejo from Mexico. She also won the Miss Media Popularity award and 1st runner-up in Best in National Costume.

Miss World Philippines 2018 
Representing Davao City, she was crowned as Miss World Philippines 2018 by the outgoing titleholder Laura Lehmann on October 7, 2018.

On September 15, 2019, Rodriguez crowned Michelle Dee as her successor at the Miss World Philippines 2019 pageant held at the Smart Araneta Coliseum in Quezon City, Philippines.

Miss World 2018 
She represented the Philippines at the Miss World 2018 in Sanya, China on December 8, 2018. She is one of favorite contestants in Miss World 2018 but failed to place in the semifinals, ending the Philippines' seven-year streak of consecutive placements, from 2011 through 2017. The event was won by Vanessa Ponce of Mexico.

Filmography

Film

Television

Personal life
Rodriguez is an advocate of peace and HIV-AIDS awareness. In 2019, she became the ambassador of Save the Children Philippines. In October 2021, she announced that she was expecting a son with her partner, businessman Niño Barbers.

Notes

References

External links

1992 births
Living people
Top Model finalists
Binibining Pilipinas winners
People from Davao City
De La Salle University alumni
Miss World Philippines winners
Miss World 2018 delegates
American people of Filipino descent
American people of Spanish descent
Filipino people of Spanish descent
People from Orlando, Florida
People from Florida